The Yoruba of West Africa (Benin, Nigeria and Togo, with migrant communities in parts of Ghana and Sierra Leone) are responsible for a distinct artistic tradition in Africa, a tradition that remains vital and influential today.

Much of the art of the Yoruba, including staffs, court dress, and beadwork for crowns, is associated with the royal courts. The courts also commissioned numerous architectural objects such as veranda posts, gates, and doors that are embellished with carvings. Other Yoruba art is related shrines and masking traditions. The Yoruba worship a large pantheon of deities, and shrines dedicated to these gods are adorned with carvings and house an array of altar figures and other ritual paraphernalia. Masking traditions vary regionally, and a wide range of mask types are employed in various festivals and celebrations.

History
In the period around 1300 CE the artists at Ife developed a refined and naturalistic sculptural tradition in terracotta, stone and copper alloy—copper, brass, and bronze— many of which appear to have been created under the patronage of King Obalufon II, the man who today is identified as the Yoruba patron deity of brass casting, weaving and regalia. Over the previous nine centuries, a number of Yoruba kingdoms have arisen. One of the first of them was Ife; Oyo was also among the first, and the Owa kingdom in the southwest kept close relations to Oyo. Benin began to have an aesthetic and cultural effect on Ife about the fourteenth century or before. Fine ivory carvings were provided by Owa artists to the Benin court, and Owa rulers modified and changed many Benin institutions and leadership insignia.

There have been a series of Yoruba kingdoms over the past nine centuries. Ife was one of the earliest of these; Oyo was also early and the Owa kingdom in the southwest maintained close ties to Oyo. Ife also experienced the artistic and cultural influence of Benin dating back to the 14th century or earlier. Owa artists supplied fine ivory work to the court at Benin and Owa royalty adapted and transformed many Benin institutions and the regalia of leadership.

Yoruba kingdoms prospered until the slave trade and warfare of the nineteenth century took their toll. One of the effects of this devastation was the dispersal of millions of Yoruba all over the world. This resulted in a strong Yoruba character in the artistic, religious and social lives of Africans in the New World.

Timeline 
Henry Drewal, John Pemberton and Rowland Abiodun propose the following stages in the development of art in Ife:

 Archaic Era, before 800 CE
 Pre-Pavement Era, 800–1000 
 Early Pavement Era, 1000–1200 
 Late Pavement Era, 1200–1400 
 Post-Pavement Era, 1400–
 Stylized Humanism Era, –the Present.

Art and life in Yoruba culture
The custom of art and artists among the Yoruba is deeply rooted in the Ifá literary corpus, indicating the orishas Ogun, Obatala, Oshun and Obalufon as central to creation mythology including artistry (i.e. the art of humanity).

In order to fully understand the centrality of art (onà) in Yoruba thought, one must be aware of their cosmology, which traces the origin of existence (ìwà) to a Supreme Divinity called Olódùmarè, the generator of ase, the enabling power that sustains and transforms the universe. To the Yoruba, art began when Olódùmarè commissioned the artist deity Obatala to mold the first human image from clay. Today, it is customary for the Yoruba to wish pregnant women good luck with the greeting: May Obatala fashion for us a good work of art.

The concept of ase influences how many of the Yoruba arts are composed. In the visual arts, a design may be segmented or seriate—a "discontinuous aggregate in which the units of the whole are discrete and share equal value with the other units." Such elements can be seen in Ifa trays and bowls, veranda posts, carved doors, and ancestral masks.

The importance of the Orí in Yoruba art and culture

The Orí-Inú, or the inner spiritual head, is very important to the Yoruba people. One's Orí-Inú is very important in terms of existing in the world. The priority goes to the Orí for any household. Thus, shrines are built in the houses. An Orí is visually represented through symbolic items within sacrifice or rituals, or more common in houses, would be terra cotta head figures. The Orí can usually determine the outcome of life for each person. Before being put into earth, each person must select their own Orí. Ajala may sometimes produce bad Orí, which this may affect the lives of those people. Sacrifices and rites happen as well in order to satisfy Orí-Isese, which is the supreme ruler over all Orí. The primary functions for sacrifices are to ward off evil and bring in good fortune and happiness.

Anonymity and authorship in African art
The issue of anonymity and authorship has long troubled the field of African art history, particularly as it relates to the political disparities between Africa and the West. Such information was, at least initially, rarely sought in the field and deemed unnecessary and even undesirable by many collectors. Susan Mullin Vogel has identified a further paradox. "[I]n their own societies," she writes, "African artists are known and even famous, but their names are rarely preserved in connection with specific works. ... More often than not, the African sculptor becomes virtually irrelevant to the life of the art object once his work is complete. ... Cultures preserve the information they value."

The problem of anonymity in Yoruba art in particular is troubling in the context of Yoruba culture where "it is absolutely imperative for individuals to acknowledge each other's identity and presence from moment to moment, [and where] there is a special greeting for every occasion and each time of day."

Several Yoruba artists' names are known, including:

Bangboshe of Osi Ilorin
Bandele Areogun of Osi
Master of Ikare
Lamidi Fakeye
Olowe of Ise

Metal arts
Yoruba blacksmiths create sculpture from iron, through hand-beating, welding, and casting. Ogun is honored as the god of iron.

Metalworkers also create brass sculptures by lost-wax casting. Brass is seen as being incorruptible by the Ogboni society.

Ivory and Wood

Terracotta

Yoruba Masquerade
The tendency in many African cosmologies to identify the body as a vehicle incarnating the soul on earth has encouraged the metaphoric use of the masquerade for a similar purpose. Egúngún, Gelede, and Epa are among the many types of Masquerade practiced by the Yoruba.

Yoruba Crowns

The bead-embroidered crown (ade) with beaded veil, foremost attribute of the Oba, symbolizes the aspirations of a civilization at the highest level of authority. In his seminal article on the topic, Robert F. Thompson writes, "The crown incarnates the intuition of royal ancestral force, the revelation of great moral insight in the person of the king, and the glitter of aesthetic experience."

Alarinjo

There is also a vibrant form of customary theatre known as Alarinjo that has its roots in the medieval period and that has given much to the contemporary Nigerian film industry

Esiẹ Museum

The museum in Esiẹ, Irepodun (Kwara state), was the first to be established in Nigeria when it opened in 1945. The museum once housed over one thousand tombstone figures or images representing human beings. It is reputed to have the largest collection of soapstone images in the world. Its works of art have also been said to bear resemblances to those of the Nok culture. In modern times, the Esie museum has been the center of religious activities and hosts a festival in the month of April every year.

References

External links
Emodying the Sacred in Yoruba Art, Newark Museum
Nigerian Traditional Arts, Crafts and Architecture
Yoruban and Akan Art in Wood and Metal, Lakeview Museum of Arts and Sciences
For spirits and kings: African art from the Paul and Ruth Tishman collection, an exhibition catalog from The Metropolitan Museum of Art Libraries (fully available online as PDF), which contains material on Yoruba art
 the web-site containing the largest existing collection of photos of Ibeji.

 
Art
Nigerian art